Chandrapal Singh may refer to:

 Chandrapal Singh (cricketer) (born 1994), Indian cricketer
 Chandrapal Singh (politician), Indian politician